Peter II (in Breton Pêr II, in French Pierre II) (1418–1457), was Duke of Brittany, Count of Montfort and titular earl of Richmond, from 1450 to his death. He was son of Duke John VI and Joan of France, and a younger brother of Francis I.

Biography

While he was Count of Guingamp, he fought against the English in Normandy in 1449 and in 1450 with his brother, Francis I, Duke of Brittany, and his uncle the Constable de Richemont. They took several cities, including Coutances, Saint-Lô and Ferns. Upon the death of his brother in 1450, Peter became Duke. Since Francis did not have a son, according to the provisions of the first Treaty of Guerande (1365) that did not allow the succession of girls, he appointed Peter in preference to his own daughters, Margaret and Marie, to succeed him. Peter II then pursued the murderers of his other brother, Gilles.

By 1455, Peter II and his wife, Frances d'Amboise, had failed to produce offspring. Given the health problems of Peter II, this raised the question of succession. To prevent the throne of Brittany from falling into foreign hands, the Duke decided to marry his niece, Margaret, the eldest daughter of his deceased  brother Francis, to his cousin, Francis, Count of Étampes. To seal the marriage, the Duke summoned the Estates of Brittany, a sovereign court, at Vannes to meet on November 13, 1455, in the upper room of la Cohue. The court, composed of the main Breton lords bishops, abbots and representatives of cities approved the marriage.

The wedding started on November 16 with a grand mass in Saint Peter's cathedral in Vannes, presided over by the Bishop of Nantes, Guillaume de Malestroit. Further celebrations subsequently took place including banquets, dances and jousts.

The relatively short reign of the Duke did not make a mark on history. His contemporaries described Peter II as simple, well advised by his wife, but little suited to the ducal function, heavy mind as body, prone to mood swings. He participated in the Battle of Castillon in 1453.

While he was still only Count of Guingamp, he had a tomb carved from himself in the Notre-Dame de Nantes which was lost during the French Revolution. It is said that, in 1803, when the church was being destroyed, the engineer Pierre Fournier opened the tomb but found only a mannequin. It is unknown whether the Duke was actually buried in the tomb.

Family

In June 1442 he married Françoise d'Amboise (1427–1485), daughter of Louis d'Amboise, Viscount of Thouars and Prince of Talmond, Françoise was later beatified by the Catholic Church. The marriage never produced any children.

Succession
Peter II died in 1457 with no known issue. He was succeeded by his uncle Arthur.

References

See also

Dukes of Brittany family tree

Brittany, Peter II, Duke of
Brittany, Peter II, Duke of
15th-century dukes of Brittany
15th-century peers of France
Peter II
House of Dreux
Montfort of Brittany